Oddville is an unincorporated community in Harrison County, Kentucky, United States. The community was established in 1799; its name was chosen so that its post office would have a unique name. The aforementioned post office operated from 1851 to 1903.

References

Unincorporated communities in Harrison County, Kentucky
Unincorporated communities in Kentucky
Populated places established in 1799